In Christian theology, a private revelation is an instance of revelation, in a broader sense of the term, of divine reality to a person or persons. It contrasts with revelation intended for humanity at large, which is sometimes termed public revelation.

Within Catholicism, an official skeptical predisposition toward accounts of private revelation is maintained. When recognized by the authority of the churchafter their credibility and religious significance has been judged positively by the local Catholic bishopthese messages are considered helpful to believers "in a certain period of history". Still, faith in them is equated to human faith, as opposed to supernaturally bestowed faith, and such beliefs are not dogmatically taught. Private revelations come in a variety of types, such as Marian apparitions and visions. Any such revelation is deemed not to add to or amend the completed revelation, but as a heavenly message that helps its recipients and other faithful live by revelation.

Catholic theology

According to the Catechism of the Catholic Church, public revelation was complete in New Testament times, but depends on interpretation and deepening understanding of this foundational or "definitive" revelation:
97 "Sacred Tradition and Sacred Scripture make up a single sacred deposit of the Word of God" in which, as in a mirror, the pilgrim Church contemplates God, the source of all her riches.66 "The Christian economy, therefore, since it is the new and definitive Covenant, will never pass away; and no new public revelation is to be expected before the glorious manifestation of our Lord Jesus Christ." Yet even if Revelation is already complete, it has not been made completely explicit; it remains for Christian faith gradually to grasp its full significance over the course of the centuries.67 Throughout the ages, there have been so-called "private" revelations, some of which have been recognized by the authority of the Church. They do not belong, however, to the deposit of faith. It is not their role to improve or complete Christ's definitive Revelation, but to help live more fully by it in a certain period of history. Guided by the Magisterium of the Church, the sensus fidelium knows how to discern and welcome in these revelations whatever constitutes an authentic call of Christ or his saints to the Church. Christian faith cannot accept "revelations" that claim to surpass or correct the Revelation of which Christ is the fulfilment.

The Catechism teaches that divine revelation was fulfilled, completed, and perfected in Christ. In this sense, Catholics believe that Christ is the fullness and mediator, author and interpreter, purpose and center of public revelation. Hence, public revelation is the deposit of faith and rule of faith and must be lived by all Catholics. Thomas Aquinas taught that all public revelation ended with the death of John the Apostle. Private revelations cannot surpass, correct, improve, fulfill, complete, or perfect public revelation.

The Catechism further teaches that divine revelation, since it is contained in the Word of God and in Christ, also includes the living tradition or sensus fidelium, the magisterium, the sacraments, and Catholic dogma. Because the living tradition and the magisterium are a part of divine revelation, they both have divine authority. Because the sacraments are a part of divine revelation, their natures cannot be changed (for example, receiving Holy Communion without mortal sin) but their ways of celebration can be changed (for example, receiving Holy Communion in the hand or on the tongue). Because Catholic dogma is a part of divine revelation, the saving truths of Christ are immutable. But what truths are dogmas has needed to be clarified by church councils, and the much more numerous doctrines have yielded to varied and increased understanding based on solid study of the Biblical roots and of the history of the topic. For this the work of theologians is indispensable, since the charism of the bishops is not to receive revelations but to determine what is Catholic teaching, the more so in doctrines that are more central to the faith and dogmatically taught. The Second Vatican Council of Bishops maintained a careful line between the "two source" (Scripture and the living tradition) and "one source" explanation of revelation, careful to acknowledge the ultimate priority of the original deposit of faith: "For Sacred Scripture is the word of God inasmuch as it is consigned to writing under the inspiration of the divine Spirit, while sacred tradition takes the word of God entrusted by Christ the Lord and the Holy Spirit to the Apostles, and hands it on to their successors in its full purity, so that led by the light of the Spirit of truth, they may in proclaiming it preserve this word of God faithfully, explain it, and make it more widely known."

In the doctrine of the Catechism, the revelations in the Word of Godsuch as the apparition of the three angels to Abraham and the angel who wrestled Jacob; the burning bush; the theophany on Mount Sinai; the pillar of cloud and pillar of fire; the visions and prophecies of the prophets; Elijah's test at the cave, and his assumption; the revelation to Peter ("You are the Christ"); the apparitions of the risen Christ to the Apostles, including the exceptional and unique apparition to Paul; the various miracles recorded in the Acts of the Apostles and in the Epistles; and the entire Book of Revelationare not private revelations but are public revelation, though their original meaning and relevance for the church today are subject to interpretation. The apparition of Our Lady of the Pillar to James the Greater is a private revelation, since it depends on facts not contained in the original deposit of faith. It, along with the canonization of saints, will never be dogmatically taught, but are taught as safe for Christian belief.

Because, as the Catechism maintains, Christ promised that the Holy Spirit would lead the church into every truth, the Lord leads the church into a deeper understanding of the original deposit. To suitably apply the truths of revelation to the needs of each age, the magisterium examines carefully private revelations, to assure that they are in accord with church doctrine. Christ warned that false prophets would come and that the tree will be known by its fruit.

Types of revelation

Private revelation is a heavenly message that helps people live by divine revelation. Various types of private revelations have been reported in the Catholic Church.

The Catechism doctrine is that private revelations can come to anyone for so long as God pleases. Some address the visionary, while others address more people. For instance, Our Lady of Laus was said to have appeared to a young shepherdess for many years, while Our Lady of Kibeho apparently addressed the leaders of the nation of Rwanda .

The appearances of the Blessed Virgin Mary are usually called Marian apparitions. These generally include a vision of the Blessed Virgin, accompanied by brief messages. These are by far the most widely reported form. Well known examples of approved Marian apparitions include Our Lady of Guadalupe, Our Lady of Lourdes and Our Lady of Fátima. These apparitions are considered private revelations from God through the Virgin Mary.

In Catholic belief, Marian visions do not mean Mary appears as a disembodied spirit, since she has been assumed into heaven. However, it is probable that Mary could appear in bodily form by bilocation.

A number of apparitions of Jesus Christ following his ascension have been reported. Some of these have received approval, as safe for private belief, from the Holy See. For instance, the Vatican biography of Faustina Kowalska quotes some of her conversations with Jesus.

Apparitions of Jesus are not the same as the Real Presence of Christ in the Eucharist, even if they include Eucharistic adoration, because the sacraments are a part of public revelation. The apparitions are also not the same as the Second Coming, because the church believes Jesus "will come again in glory to judge the living and the dead."

There are also reports of interior locutions in which inner voices are reported, but no vision of divinity is claimed. The Vatican biographies of both Teresa of Ávila and Mother Teresa of Calcutta refer to their interior locutions, although Mother Teresa often preferred to remain private about them.

Some private revelations produce large amounts of text, while others amount to a few reported sentences. For instance, the priest Stefano Gobbi produced a book of messages attributed to the Blessed Virgin Mary, while Mary of the Divine Heart Droste zu Vischering simply wrote two letters to Pope Leo XIII with a message attributed to Jesus Christ, prompting the Pope to consecrate the world to the Sacred Heart of Jesus.

The church does not regard occultism – spiritism, automatic writing, astrology, fortune-telling, psychic powers, magic, divination, conjuring the dead, etc. – as types of private revelations.

The church also does not regard private revelations as having authority over the Pope or the bishops in communion with him, because the church, the bishop, and public revelation have divine authority as a matter of faith, while private revelations are not a matter of faith but are believed with human faith. Private revelations neither have divine authority nor can they be believed with divine and catholic faith, and a proof of this is that the Magisterium infallibly interprets the inerrant Word of God, whereas saints can make errors about the details of private revelations, since fallen human nature is inclined to sin and error. Hence, Catholics cannot disobey the church in favor of obeying private revelation.

Sources of revelation

According to the Catholic Church private revelations come from God, while false revelations come either from human or demonic sources. Just as in exorcism, the Catholic Church is careful to distinguish between supernatural events, mental illness, drug abuse, deception, and demonic activity. The church gathers a team of scientists, theologians, and other experts to test the spirit of the alleged visionary to see if he is genuine, psychotic or manipulative, influenced by drugs, deceptive or deceived, or possessed by demons.

According to the Catholic Church revelations from God are an extraordinary grace which confirms Catholic doctrine and dogma. One famous example is Our Lady of Lourdes, who declared Mary to be the Immaculate Conception four years after the dogma of the Immaculate Conception was proclaimed. Because they are extraordinary, revelations are not to be confused with holiness. Because they are a grace, no one can rightfully desire to receive revelations. Because they remind the faithful of what is already contained in public revelation, private revelations can sometimes occur in unexpected ways, such as the stigmata, which reminds Catholics of the Paschal Mystery; weeping statues, which remind of sin and mercy; and the mystical ring of Catherine of Siena, which reminds of mystical marriage.

Eugenia Ravasio reported a series of messages from God the Father, which were published as "The Father speaks to His children". Ravasio's messages were approved by Bishop Alexander Caillot of Grenoble, that ordered an investigation and after ten years issued a letter stating that the messages had a divine nature. In 1988 the messages received also the imprimatur of Cardinal Petrus Canisius Van Lierde, the Vicar General for the Vatican City State, whose general duties were the administration of daily functions of Vatican City. The Congregation for the Doctrine of the Faith at the Holy See, which is the official authority for approving private revelations on behalf of the Catholic Church, did not declare Ravasio's writings heresy, so this is not controversial to the Catholic Church.

False revelations
A common human source of false revelations is pareidolia, where people see visions or hear voices where there are none. The church claims that apparitions and visions cannot be photographed and messages and locutions cannot be recorded. Despite this, some people believe in the apparitions of Zeitoun; the church, however, has never judged the alleged apparitions.

Another human source of false revelations is misattribution, where people put words into saints' and other persons' mouths, such as the "three days of darkness" prophecy attributed to Padre Pio of Pietrelcina, the "end-times" prophecy attributed to Our Lady of Laus, and the Medjugorje sayings attributed to Pope John Paul II.

According to the church a common demonic source of false revelations is demonic possession. It claims that Satan can appear like an angel of light and rebuke people for their sins, and mimic the miracles and revelations of God. The most famous case is Magdalena de la Cruz, through whom Satan uttered false prophecies and fabricated miracles, including uncreated light, stigmata, levitation, ecstasy, and extraordinary fasting (she allegedly survived solely on the Eucharist).

It is a misconception that the church is quick to accept mental illness or drug abuse, such as schizophrenia or hallucinogens, for private revelation and demonic activity. The church is skeptical, and only accepts private revelation after discernment, because it is "the pillar and bulwark of the truth" and because it has a long history of dealing with fraudulent visionaries.

Discernment of revelation

Just as with all charisms, the charisms of prophecy, speaking in tongues, and miracles are subject to discernment.

The Catholic Church uses the 1987 Normae Congregationis to discern and judge private revelations. Firstly, the local Catholic bishop judges the alleged revelation according to its fruits. The term "fruits" is used here in its role as a common Biblical metaphor (as in Matthew 7:16):
Good Fruits
the alleged revelation likely happened/is happening, and is not attributable to postdiction and hoaxes
the alleged visionary is mentally healthy, honest, humble, and lives a normal life
conformity to public revelation and immunity from error in faith or morals
healthy devotion to the alleged revelation (adherence to Dogma, submission to the Bishop, obedience of faith, etc.)
abundant spiritual fruits that spring from said healthy devotion (prayer, conversion, charity, etc.)
Bad Fruits
the alleged revelation did not actually happen (someone mistaking sun dogs for a miracle, etc.)
doctrinal errors attributed to God or a Saint, although this does not include redaction 
using the alleged revelation for fame, fortune, sex, or other gains 
occultism or other grave sins (drug abuse, etc.) in connection with the alleged revelation
mental illness, psychotic tendencies, and demonic activity

Examples of revelations with good and bad fruits include:
 the revelations to the Polish mystic Faustina Kowalska were promoted by Pope John Paul II from before his papacy, and received his approval as safe in practice;
 the Mariavite revelations contained heresy and attacked critics, despite promoting popular piety and frequency of the sacraments.

When judgment is favorable, the bishop permits a local devotion without judging the revelation to be worthy of belief, which can include being favorable toward miracles in connection with the revelation without approving of the revelation itself. This step is commonly called "approved for faith expression." Then, after the bishop sees a healthy devotion to the revelation and abundant spiritual fruits spring from said devotion, he judges the revelation to be worthy of belief: the private revelation contains nothing contrary to Catholic faith or morals, the faithful are authorized to prudently believe in the private revelation (without obligation), and it is legal to publish the private revelation. In addition, the bishop approves of the titles – such as "Our Lady" – given to a Marian apparition (Our Lady of Lourdes, for example).

Judgment on private revelations falls under a bishop's ordinary magisterium, which is authoritative but noninfallible and requires religious submission of intellect and will. A bishop or his successor could overturn a prior judgment, such as happened in the case of the apparitions of The Lady of All Nations.

A bishop can judge an alleged private revelation to be either worthy of belief (constat de supernaturalitate) or not worthy of belief (constat de non supernaturalitate). A private revelation that is worthy of belief can receive full approval if it is approved by the Pope, such as happened with the revelations to Margaret Mary. Papal approval does not include popes visiting sites of alleged revelations, granting special privileges to shrines, offering gifts to alleged visionaries, or speaking favorably of alleged revelations or visionaries. A private revelation that is not worthy of belief can either be more fully investigated or, if bad fruits are found, condemned. A condemned revelation may not be followed, believed, or published by the faithful.

A bishop can judge an alleged private revelation before it ends, such as was the case with the prophecies of Montanus (condemned) and the prophecies of Elizabeth Barton (approved). Fraudulent visionaries sometimes counter the negative judgments of their bishops, and skeptics of authentic revelations sometimes counter positive judgments, by saying the bishops didn't do a thorough investigation, such as interviewing the visionaries.

Not all reports of private revelation are approved, even if they have good fruits. For instance, reports of Our Lady of Surbiton claiming that the Virgin Mary appeared every day under a pine tree in England were flatly rejected by the Vatican as a fraud.

It is permissible, with the bishop's permission, to make a shrine in honor of an approved revelation. However, no one is obligated to believe in a private revelation, since it is not public revelation; just as no one is obligated to practice popular piety, since it is not the liturgy. Only public revelation and the liturgy are obligatory, for they are necessary for salvation. Despite this, some Catholics, such as the Fatima Crusaders, believe the rosary is necessary for world peace because Our Lady of Fatima said "Pray the Rosary every day, in order to obtain peace for the world, and the end of the war."

Publication of revelation
On October 23, 1995 the Congregation for the Doctrine of the Faith clarified about private revelations:

With regard to the spreading of texts of presumed personal revelations, the Congregation makes it clear that:

 The interpretation by some people of a decision approved by Paul VI on October 14, 1966, and promulgated on November 15 of the same year, by virtue of which writings and messages coming from presumed revelations might be freely spread within the Church is absolutely not valid. This decision actually referred to the 'Abolition of the Index of Banned Books,' and said that - once relative censures were lifted - the moral obligation in any case not to spread or read those writings which endangered faith and morals still remained.
 A reminder, therefore, that for the diffusion of texts of presumed private revelations, the norm of the Code in force, Canon 823, para 1, which gives pastors the right 'to demand that the writings of the faithful which touch faith or morals be submitted to their own judgment before publication', remains valid.
 Presumed supernatural revelations and writings which regard them are in the first instance subject to the judgment of the diocesan bishop and, in particular cases, to that of the episcopal conference and the Congregation of the Doctrine of the Faith.

It is a misconception that the faithful do not need permission to publish alleged private revelations since the abolition of Canon 1399 and 2318 of the former Canonical Code by Pope Paul VI in AAS 58 (1966) on October 14, 1966. The truth is that Pope Paul VI only abolished the Index Librorum Prohibitorum, and that Canon 823 and 824 of the current 1983 Code of Canon Law define the right and duty of the bishop to censor all material concerning faith or morals.

The canonization of a mystic or an imprimatur given to a book of revelations do not mean a private revelation is authentic, because the church does not pronounce on alleged revelations when it pronounces on the holiness of an individual and because the Imprimatur only guarantees that a book is free from all doctrinal and moral errors.

Controversy
Certain private revelations have been the subject of conspiracy theories. The theories include church coverups, church officials siding with the local government to destroy apparitions, visionaries' doubles, and church corruption. It is sometimes claimed that private revelations prove conspiracy theories. For instance, some UFO conspiracy theorists claim that the Miracle of the Sun was a UFO.

Latter Day Saint theology
In the  Latter Day Saint movement, continuing revelation is the principle that God or his divine agents still continue to communicate to humankind. The founder of the movement Joseph Smith, Jr. used the example of the Lord's revelations to Moses in  Deuteronomy to explain the importance and necessity of continuous revelation to guide "those who seek diligently to know [God's] precepts":

Both the Church of Jesus Christ of Latter-day Saints (LDS Church) and the Community of Christ, the two largest denominations in the Latter Day Saint movement have a tradition of continuing revelation and have added modern public revelations to their canon of scriptures.

In the LDS Church, in addition to teaching the importance of studying the words of both ancient and modern prophets, the church also emphasize the necessity of private or personal revelation from God by the power of the Holy Ghost as the only pathway to true knowledge of Jesus Christ:

Boyd K. Packer, a member of the Quorum of the Twelve Apostles, explained the source and process of personal revelation:

In another sermon, Packer warned Latter-day Saints against the dangers of over reliance on a rational or theological approach to knowledge of gospel principles:

LDS Church President Spencer W. Kimball also emphasized the importance of personal revelation versus the analytical approach in understanding the message of Jesus Christ:

Although Latter-day Saints believe that personal revelation is an essential part of the plan of salvation, leaders of the church emphasize that true personal revelation should never contradict official revelation from the leadership of the church. Hartman Rector Jr. taught some basic criteria during a speech at BYU entitled "How to Know if Revelation Is from the Lord" that can help members of the church know whether the revelation that someone receives is actually coming from God. The following excerpt is the conclusion of this speech.

James E. Faust explained the difference between apostolic and personal revelation: "The prophets, seers, and revelators have had and still have the responsibility and privilege of receiving and declaring the word of God for the world. Individual members, parents, and leaders have the right to receive revelation for their own responsibility but have no duty nor right to declare the word of God beyond the limits of their own responsibility."

See also

 Beatific vision
 Christian contemplation
 Marian apparition
 Mysticism
 Neo-revelationism
 Religious experience
 Revelation (Latter Day Saints)
 Theosis (Eastern Christian theology)
 Vision (spirituality)
 Visions of Jesus and Mary

References

Catholic theology and doctrine
Christian terminology
Revelation
Hallucinations